Zangmo is a surname. Notable people with the surname include:

Dechen Zangmo, Bhutanese politician in office 2013–2018
Neten Zangmo (born 1961), Bhutanese government official and politician
Shukseb Jetsun Chönyi Zangmo (1852–1953), Tibetan Buddhist nun
Tashi Zangmo (born 1963), Bhutanese activist

See also

Zango (disambiguation)
Dzongkha-language surnames
Surnames of Bhutanese origin